Redkinia is a genus of rod-like Ediacaran fossil fringed with large and small projections which has been putatively compared with the mandibles of an Arthropod  and the mouthparts of Wiwaxia and Odontogriphus. If it were to have been a jaw, it would have been used for filter-feeding rather than crushing.

References

Proterozoic animals